Iridodial is an iridoid.  It is produced from 8-oxogeranial by the enzyme iridoid synthase (IS).  Iridodial is one of the substrates for the enzyme iridoid oxidase (IO) which produces 7-deoxyloganetic acid.

Although it may not be known at this time whether the compound proper iridodial is actually present in natural plant species or not, the use of analogous ion iridodial cation is mentioned in several papers on iridoid biosyntheses in plant species.

References

Iridoids
Aldehydes
Cyclopentanes